Peter Springett (8 May 1946 – 28 September 1997) was an English professional footballer in the 1960s and 1970s and the brother of fellow professional footballer Ron Springett. He made over 500 professional appearances in the football league as a goalkeeper.

Career
He played in goal for Queen's Park Rangers and later Sheffield Wednesday, Barnsley, Scarborough and Frickley Athletic.

He made his debut in 1963 against Peterborough United and went on to play 137 league games for QPR. Peter was part of the QPR team in 1966–67 that won both the Third Division Championship and the League Cup, beating West Bromwich Albion 3–2 at Wembley Stadium on 4 March 1967.

He moved to Sheffield Wednesday in 1967 in a unique swap deal for his brother, England international Ron Springett.

International career
He made appearances at youth level for England, but unlike his elder brother he was never capped as a full international.

Later life
After retiring from the game he became a police officer and was present when the stolen European Cup was handed in at West Bar Police Station after Aston Villa's 1982 win.

Death
His death in Sheffield on 28 August 1997 came at the end of a four-year battle against cancer.

References

Queens Park Rangers F.C. players
Sheffield Wednesday F.C. players
Barnsley F.C. players
Frickley Athletic F.C. players
England under-23 international footballers
Footballers from Fulham
1946 births
1997 deaths
Association football goalkeepers
English footballers